Tres dólares de plomo is a 1964 Spaghetti Western film directed by Pino Mercanti.

Plot

Cast
Fred Beir as  Rudy Wallace
Evi Marandi as Anne (as Evy Harandis) (as Evy Marandi)
Francisco Nieto as Morrison
Richard Saint-Bris as Laurence (as Rich. St. Bris)
Dina De Santis (as Dyna De Saint) (as Dina De Saint)
Olivier Mathot as Morrison Henchman (as Oliver Mathot)
Roberto Messina as Mark (as Roberto Messanger)
Ángel Álvarez
Andrea Fantasia as Ex-Sheriff

External links
 
 Tres dólares de plomo at Variety Distribution

1964 films
Spanish Western (genre) films
Italian Western (genre) films
1960s Italian-language films
1964 Western (genre) films
Spaghetti Western films
Films directed by Pino Mercanti
1960s Italian films